Dendrobium gibsonii is a species of orchid native to China (Guangxi and Yunnan provinces), the Himalayas (Nepal, Bhutan, India, Assam), and northern Indochina (Myanmar, Thailand, Laos, Vietnam).

References

External links
IOSPE orchid photos, Dendrobium gibsonii Paxton 1838 Photo courtesy of © Lourens Grobler 
Orchids Online, Dendrobium gibsonii

gibsonii
Orchids of Asia
Flora of Indo-China
Flora of the Indian subcontinent
Plants described in 1838